Mount Nimmel is a small mountain located in Springbrook, part of the Gold Coast hinterland of South East Queensland, Australia. Nimmel is an Australian indigenous word meaning 'Conspicuous Mountain', which is ironic, considering it is very small when compared to the nearby Springbrook Mountain, Tamborine Mountain and Mount Cougal's twin peaks.  The peak is protected within Springbrook National Park.

Events
Every year the Kokoda Challenge Gold Coast ascends Mount Nimmel as one leg of the walking challenge.

See also

 List of mountains in Australia

References
 Mt Nimmel and the nine-year itch

Nimmel, Mount
Springbrook, Queensland